Choral Songs in honour of Her Majesty Queen Victoria is a collection of 13 choral songs by 13 British composers issued on the occasion of the 80th birthday of Queen Victoria in 1899.

In 1897-1898 the Master of the Queen's Music Sir Walter Parratt proposed a volume of choral songs modelled on The Triumphs of Oriana (1601) as part of the planned 80th birthday celebrations. He recruited 13 British composers, and in 1899 a limited edition of only 100 copies was produced entitled Choral Songs in honour of Her Majesty Queen Victoria.

The actual title on the front of the book is "Choral Songs by Various Writers & Composers in Honour of Her Majesty Queen Victoria".

Contents

Recordings
 Choral Songs in honour of Her Majesty Queen Victoria. Spiritus Chamber Choir dir. Aidan Oliver Toccata Classics 2008

References

External links
 
 
 
 
 
 
 
 
 
 
 
 
 
 

Music books
1899 books
Choral music
Cultural depictions of Queen Victoria
1899 in the United Kingdom
1899 compositions